The  is a Japanese railway line in Hokkaido operated by Hokkaido Railway Company (JR Hokkaido) which connects Fukagawa Station in Fukagawa and Rumoi Station in Rumoi.

Stations
Stops legend: ●: All trains stop, ◆: some trains stop, ▼: some down trains pass, ▲: some up trains pass

Closed section

History
The initial section of the line, between Fukagawa and Rumoi opened on 23 October 1910, and was extended to Mashike on 5 November 1921. The line was reclassified as a "main line" from 10 October 1931. With the privatization of Japanese National Railways (JNR) on 1 April 1987, the line came under the control of JR Hokkaido.

Partial closure and closure plans
On 10 August 2015, JR Hokkaido informed the mayors of Rumoi and Mashike of its plans to close the  section of the line from Rumoi and Mashike in 2016. In April 2016, it was officially announced that the section from Rumoi to Mashike would close, and the last service operated on 4 December of that year. The remaining section is also at very serious risk of closure, due to extremely poor passenger numbers. The 4 towns and cities along the line. Rumoi, Numata, Chippubetsu and Fukagawa were in discussion with JR Hokkaido regarding the line's future, but Rumoi left the group as the city was already well-equipped so they didn't see keeping the railway open as necessary. For this reason, the section of the line running from Ishikari Numata - Rumoi will likely be closed in the distant future. The 3 remaining municipalities are still in discussion with JR Hokkaido and it has been clarified that they are working to keep the Fukagawa–Ishikari-Numata section open for the benefit of students who use the railway to travel to and from their schools. in September 2022, JR Hokkaido submitted a proposal to the Ministry of Land, Infrastructure, Transport and Tourism to close an additional  between Ishikari-Numata and Rumoi. Since the abolishment was approved, the service end date was moved up to March 31, 2023, and the abolition date was moved up to April 1, 2023. The remaining  section to Fukagawa is slated to be closed in March 2026. The proposal to close the section between Ishikari-Numata and Rumoi was approved on 9 December 2022. In addition, the scheduled March 2026 closure of the final section to Fukagawa remains as planned.

References

Lines of Hokkaido Railway Company
Rail transport in Hokkaido
Railway lines opened in 1910
1910 establishments in Japan
1067 mm gauge railways in Japan